Curtin University, formerly known as Curtin University of Technology and Western Australian Institute of Technology (WAIT), is an Australian public research university based in Bentley, Perth, Western Australia. It is named after John Curtin, Prime Minister of Australia from 1941 to 1945, and is the largest university in Western Australia, with 59,939 students in 2021.

Curtin was conferred university status after legislation was passed by the Parliament of Western Australia in 1986. Since then, the university has expanded its presence and has campuses in Singapore, Malaysia, Dubai and Mauritius, and has ties with 90 exchange universities in 20 countries. The university comprises five main faculties with over 95 specialists centres. It had a campus in Sydney from 2005 to 2016.

Curtin University is a member of the Australian Technology Network. Curtin University is active in research in a range of academic and practical fields. Curtin is the only Western Australian university whose students have won the Australian Institute of Nuclear Science and Engineering's Postgraduate Student Gold Medal as at 2020.

History 
Curtin University was founded in 1966 as the Western Australian Institute of Technology. Its nucleus comprised the tertiary programs of the Perth Technical College, which opened in 1900. The university's Bentley campus was selected in 1962, and officially opened in 1966. The first students enrolled the following year.

In 1969, three more institutions were merged with WAIT: the Kalgoorlie School of Mines (opened in 1902), the Muresk Agricultural College (opened in 1926), and the Schools of Physiotherapy and Occupational Therapy (in operation since the 1950s at Shenton Park). Between 1966 and 1976 WAIT experienced an expansion from 2,000 to 10,000 students.

In December 1986 WAIT was made a university, under provisions of the WA Institute of Technology Amendment Act 1986. Curtin University took its name from the former Prime Minister of Australia, John Curtin. In 1987, Curtin University of Technology became Western Australia's third university and Australia's first university of technology.

In 1993, Curtin founded a graduate business school in St Georges Terrace. It was moved to Murray Street in 2002, where it remains today. The school was developed on the foundation of Curtin's existing Master of Business Administration program.

In 2005, Curtin and Murdoch University were engaged in a feasibility study into the possibility of a merger. However, on 7 November 2005, both institutions announced that a merger would not be undertaken. In 2008, Curtin opened a campus in Singapore, its second offshore presence. In 2009, Curtin became the first university in the Australian Technology Network to be listed on the Academic Ranking of World Universities of research universities.

In 2010, Curtin dropped the "of Technology" suffix, from then operating as "Curtin University".

Campuses 

Curtin has multiple smaller off-site campuses within the Perth metropolitan area. The Graduate School of Business building is located in the Perth central business district in the renovated former Government Printing Office, and the law school is located on Murray Street in the old Public Health Department and Chief Secretary's building, a listed building on the State Register of Heritage Places. In 2016, Curtin entered into an agreement with the National Trust of Australia (WA) to use the restored Old Perth Boys' School at 139 St Georges Terrace for community and industry engagement. In 2018, Curtin University renovated the original Perth Technical College building at 137 St Georges Terrace to create meeting rooms, and learning spaces for professional development and postgraduate courses.

Exploration Geophysics and Petroleum Engineering are located at the co-location research facilities of the Australian Resources Research Centre (ARRC) which also houses offices of CSIRO Earth Science and Resource Engineering and National Measurement Institute. The ARRC is located in the Technology Park Bentley, adjacent to the main Bentley campus.
Some university staff, researchers and students on practicum work in other locations such as the Oral Health Centre of WA (OHCWA) in Nedlands and at Royal Perth Hospital, amongst other organisations.

Curtin has campuses outside Perth, the largest being the Western Australian School of Mines at Kalgoorlie, and a number of micro-campuses in locations such as Esperance, Margaret River and Geraldton. Nursing is the only course offered in Geraldton. The Muresk Institute at Northam left Curtin in 2012.

Dubai campus 
In April 2017 Curtin University established its newest campus in Dubai at Dubai International Academic City. Australian Ambassador to the UAE HE Arthur Spyrou officially opened the campus on 10 September 2017. Curtin University Dubai courses use the same structure and unit curriculum as those offered at the Bentley campus. Curtin University Dubai is accredited by the Knowledge and Human Development Authority (KHDA). The academic qualifications granted by Curtin University is certified by KHDA and is recognised in the Emirate of Dubai by all public and private entities.

Malaysia campus 

The campus in Miri, Sarawak, Malaysia is Curtin's largest international campus. Curtin's operations in Miri began in February 1999. In 2002, a purpose-built campus was opened as Curtin's first offshore campus and the first foreign university campus in East Malaysia. It has around 4,000 students from over 45 countries, and academics from more than 15 countries. Curtin Malaysia is the only approved CISCO Networking University in Miri and Brunei.

Singapore campus 

Curtin University opened a Singapore-based campus on 23 November 2008.
Curtin Singapore courses use the same structure and unit curriculum as those offered at the Bentley campus.

Mauritius campus 
Curtin University opened its fourth international campus in Mauritius on 3 May 2018 on the campus of Charles Telfair Institute in Moka south of Port Louis.

Former Sydney campus (2005–2016) 
Curtin University Sydney (Curtin Sydney) was established on 20 June 2005. The first campus was located in The Rocks area. It was later relocated to the suburb of Chippendale where it occupied the historical Berlei Building. The operation of Curtin Sydney was contracted out to private tertiary education provider Navitas Group. It offered diploma, undergraduate and postgraduate courses to international students. In 2014 Curtin Sydney was involved in a cash-for-results scandal where students since 2012 had paid MyMaster, a Sydney company, up to $1,000 each to write essays and assignments for them, as well as sit online tests. In 2015, Curtin announced the closure of Curtin Sydney from early 2017.

Organisation

Faculties 

From 2007, the university's teaching and research is divided into five faculties (previously known as divisions), which each include a number of schools. These schools were consolidated in 2020 during a period of staff cuts. These are:
 Centre for Aboriginal Studies
 Faculty of Business and Law
 School of Accounting, Economics and Finance
 School of Management and Marketing
 Curtin Law School
 Faculty of Health Sciences
 Curtin Medical School
Curtin School of Allied Health
Curtin School of Nursing
Curtin School of Population Health
 Faculty of Humanities
 School of Design and the Built Environment
 School of Media, Creative Arts and Social Inquiry
 School of Education
 Faculty of Science and Engineering
 School of Civil and Mechanical Engineering
 School of Earth and Planetary Sciences
 School of Electrical Engineering, Computing and Mathematical Sciences
 School of Molecular and Life Sciences
 Western Australian School of Mines: Minerals and Energy Engineering

Libraries 
The main library building is the TL Robertson Library, located on the Bentley campus. It opened in 1972. After the building was extended in the 1990s, the university began a major refurbishment in 2021, due for completion in 2023. Also located on the Bentley campus is the John Curtin Prime Ministerial Library, holding a large collection of papers relating to John Curtin as well as other special collections including the papers of political figures John Dawkins, Geoff Gallop, Hazel Hawke, and Carmen Lawrence, and Curtin academics Mike Daube (tobacco control) and Jules Black (sexology).

John Curtin Gallery
The John Curtin Gallery (JCG) is located on the Bentley campus, in building 200A. It has a focus on contemporary art, learning and research.

Transport
Curtin has two of its own bus stations, which is connected to the Transperth public transport network. The station is also linked to the Mandurah railway line's Canning Bridge Station by a shuttle bus service. The university also has its own internal bus network trialling autonomous buses on campus.

Academic profile
The university is one of the partners in the Western Australian Pregnancy Cohort (Raine) Study, one of the largest cohorts of pregnancy, childhood, adolescence and early adulthood to be carried out anywhere in the world.

Rankings and reputation 

Curtin University has achieved 'Top 10 Australia University' status in 6 out of 10 major global rankings (ARWU, US News, CWUR, Leiden, RUR, URAP). Curtin is ranked 160th globally and 10th nationwide by U.S. News & World Report Best Global Universities Rankings in 2023. Curtin University is again ranked in the world's top one percent of universities and ninth in Australia based on the 2022 Academic Ranking of World Universities.

In addition, Curtin University has achieved its highest-ever result in the annual QS World University Rankings by rising to 193rd globally in the 2023 edition. It was ranked 2nd in the world for Engineering - Mineral & Mining, and ranked 5th in Australia for Architecture in the 2022 QS World University Rankings by Subject.

Curtin's Creative Writing staff and alumni have won the Miles Franklin Award seven times.

Student life

Accommodation
Curtin University offers on campus accommodation at five separate precincts which are managed by UniLodge. These accommodation options include Kurrajong Village, Erica Underwood House, Guild House, Vickery House and St Catherine's College.

Student guild 
The Curtin Student Guild is the student union at Curtin University. The guild was founded as the WAIT Student Guild in January 1969.

The guild provides student representation services through the provision of faculty, international, postgraduate and equity representatives and the professional support service Student Assist.

The guild operates most of the food and beverage outlets on campus, including Guild Cafés (Central, Engineering, Library), Angazi, Concept Coffee Co,  Mallokup and Beakers food outlets. Other commercial services include G-Mart, Curtin University's general store, printing, stationery and news outlet and The Tav.

The guild operates and funds all Curtin student clubs and societies. The guild also runs a number of events throughout the year, most notably the Toga Party held in semester one and the previous notable event Grasslands Music Festival held in semester two. The guild publishes Grok magazine.

The Student Guild is governed by students through the Guild Council which consists of executive members: president, vice-presidents, secretary and chair of the Representation Board and councillors. All other representatives sit on the Representation Board. Student representatives are elected to their positions by students in annual elections held in September. Major Groups that contest elections include Illuminate, Progress, Left Action and the Joke Ticket. The Guild is currently operated by an Illuminate majority.

Sport

Men's soccer
The men's team of the Curtin University Football Club is based on the main campus. The club currently (2023) competes in the Football West State League Division 2.

Women's soccer
The Curtin University FC Women's team are one of the inaugural teams in the new National Premier Leagues WA Women competition (which commenced in 2020), and is a part of the National Premier Leagues Women’s structure. Previously they had been a part of the Women State League Division 1 from (at least) 2012 to 2019.

Notable people

Faculty and staff
Curtin's faculty includes prominent scholars such as environmental scientist Peter Newman, writer Kim Scott and isotope geochemist Kliti Grice.

Past prominent faculty members include the post-modernist Niall Lucy, writer Elizabeth Jolley and journalist Robert Duffield.

Alumni

 
Among people to attend Curtin University are:

Aboriginal Studies
 Joan Winch, nurse and educator
Business and Law
 Cody Fern, actor
 Samantha Hall, entrepreneur, environmental and Antarctic researcher
 Brad Hogg, cricketer
 Dean Israelite, film director
Health Sciences
 John Worsfold, coach of the Essendon Football Club and ex-coach of the West Coast Eagles
Humanities
 Mouza Sulaiman Mohamed Al-Wardi, museum curator, Director of the Collections Department at the National Museum (Oman).
 James Angus, sculptor
 Natalie Barr, news presenter on Seven Network's Sunrise
 Carrie Bickmore, co-host of The Project (Australian TV program)
 John Butler, musician
 Michaelia Cash, Attorney-General of Australia, member of Australian Senate
 Natalia Cooper, journalist for Nine News at the Nine Network Sydney
 Priya Cooper, Gold medal swimmer at the Sydney Paralympic Games
 Judy Davis, Golden Globe and Emmy Award-winning actress
 Jessica De Gouw, actress
 Jon Doust, comedian, writer, novelist and professional speaker
 Elissa Down, film director
 Valerie Glover, artist
 Claire Hooper, comedian
 Kenneth Maxwell, educationist
 Hannah McGlade, academic, human rights advocate and lawyer
 Judith Lucy, comedian
 Frances O'Connor, actress
 David McComb, lead singer The Triffids, songwriter and poet
 Sheila McHale, former Cabinet minister in the Government of Western Australia
 Ljiljanna Ravlich, former Cabinet minister in the Government of Western Australia
 Kate Raynes-Goldie, game designer and social media scholar
 Tracy Ryan, poet
 Philip Salom, poet
 Elaine Smith, actor
 Ben Templesmith, illustrator & author of 30 Days of Night
 Tim Winton, author
Science and Engineering
 Jim Geelen, professor
 Samantha Hall, entrepreneur, environmental and Antarctic researcher
 Andrew Long, geophysicist
 Zaneta Mascarenhas, engineer and Labor member for Swan

Controversies
Curtin has become active in research and partnerships overseas, particularly in mainland China, and has received funding from major Chinese companies such as Tencent. It is involved in a number of business, management, and research projects, particularly in supercomputing, where the university participates in a tri-continental array with nodes in Perth, Beijing, and Edinburgh. The Chinese Premier Wen Jiabao visited the Woodside-funded hydrocarbon research facility during his visit to Australia in 2005. Funding from major Chinese companies connected to the state have led to concerns that Curtin University has limited academic freedom on certain topics.

See also

 API Network, a publisher associated with the university and University of Queensland
 List of universities in Australia

References

External links
 
 Curtin Alumni
 Curtin University, Dubai campus
 Curtin University, Malaysia campus
 Curtin University, Singapore campus

 
Educational institutions established in 1966
1966 establishments in Australia
Australian vocational education and training providers
Universities in Western Australia
Australian Technology Network
Educational institutions established in 1986
1986 establishments in Australia
Bentley, Western Australia
Education in Perth, Western Australia
Art museums and galleries in Western Australia